Presidential Airways  may refer to:

Presidential Airways (charter) an American charter airline based in Florida
Presidential Airways (scheduled) a failed American passenger airline from the 1980s